Peter Mackenzie Millman (August 10, 1906 – December 11, 1990) was a Canadian astronomer. He worked at the Dunlap Observatory from 1933 until 1940. In early 1941 he enlisted with the Royal Canadian Air Force. In 1946 he joined the Dominion Observatory in Ottawa. He then transferred to the National Research Council in 1955.

During his graduate studies at Harvard University he started a systematic study of meteor spectra at the suggestion of Harlow Shapley in 1929. He continued the work on meteors throughout his active scientific life. He organized one of his most successful observational campaigns in 1946, when on the night of October 9/10 a spectacular shower of the Giacobinids (October Draconids) provided many important photographic spectra.

He was awarded the J. Lawrence Smith Medal in 1954.

A crater on Mars and the minor planet 2904 Millman were named in his honor.

External links
Obituary by Ian Halliday
Peter Millman Biography

1906 births
1990 deaths
Harvard University alumni
20th-century Canadian astronomers
Canadian expatriates in the United States